Bøkfjorden is a fjord in Sør-Varanger Municipality in Troms og Finnmark county, Norway. At this place the Bøkfjord Bridge is located, which crosses the river/fjord where they meet.

The town of Kirkenes lies on the shore of the fjord. The large island of Skogerøya lies on the western side of the fjord. The Bøkfjord Lighthouse is located in the mouth of the Bøkfjorden.

References

Sør-Varanger
Fjords of Troms og Finnmark